Jirajara is an extinct language of western Venezuela. Other than being part of the Jirajaran family, its classification is uncertain due to a lack of data. See Jirajaran languages for details.

References

Languages of Venezuela
Extinct languages of South America
Jirajaran languages